ElringKlinger AG is a German car spare parts manufacturer headquartered in Dettingen an der Erms, Germany. As a worldwide development partner and original equipment supplier of cylinder-head and specialty gaskets, plastic housing modules, shielding components for engine, transmission, exhaust systems and underbody, exhaust gas purification technology as well as battery and fuel cell components ElringKlinger provides its products to almost all of the world's vehicle and engine manufacturers. As at May 3, 2017, in addition to the parent company, the ElringKlinger Group included 44 fully consolidated subsidiaries (including a joint venture with a total of five companies).

Today, ElringKlinger employs roughly 9,724 people in 45 locations worldwide.

History 
In 1879, Paul Lechler founded a company trading in gaskets and technical products in Stuttgart. The company began manufacturing its own gaskets in 1914. Its headquarters were moved to Dettingen an der Erms between 1964 and 1965. Back in 1885, Richard Klinger had established an engineering workshop in Vienna, which also started producing cylinder-head gaskets in 1930.

The company's international expansion began in 1971 with the acquisition of its first ownership interest in Spain. Its manufacturing sites in Bietigheim-Bissingen and Langenzenn were set up in the following year.

In 1994, the automotive divisions of Richard Klinger GmbH and Elring GmbH joined forces to form ElringKlinger GmbH, with its headquarters in Dettingen. On October 30, 2000, ElringKlinger GmbH merged with the parent company ZWL Grundbesitz- und Beteiligungs-AG and took the new name ElringKlinger AG. ElringKlinger AG has been listed on the Frankfurt and Stuttgart stock exchanges since January 21, 2002. The company was accepted into the SDAX on November 13, 2003, and the MDAX on March 4, 2009. At its meeting of March 3, 2016, Deutsche Börse agreed changes to the composition of its equity indices, which returned ElringKlinger AG stock to the SDAX with effect from March 21, 2016.

Effective from October 27, 2009, ElringKlinger acquired the automotive supplier Ompaş, based in the Turkish city of Bursa, to gain a foothold in the Turkish market.

This was followed by the purchase of Hug Group, a Swiss exhaust specialist, on May 11, 2011.

Effective from September 12, 2011, ElringKlinger AG acquired 90 percent of the Lenningen-based mold- and toolmaker Hummel-Formen.

ElringKlinger purchased ThaWa GmbH, a manufacturer of metal housings headquartered in Thale, Saxony-Anhalt, on January 3, 2012.

The Japanese joint venture ElringKlinger Marusan Corporation and its subsidiaries were fully consolidated as of December 31, 2013, based on a contractual agreement on the exercise of control.

In July 2014, ElringKlinger AG acquired 75 percent of new enerday GmbH, a company based in the German town of Neubrandenburg.

ElringKlinger Kunststofftechnik GmbH acquired all interests in Polytetra GmbH, a processor of fluoropolymers and conventional high-performance plastics, in October 2014.

In February 2015, ElringKlinger acquired the U.S. automotive supplier M&W Manufacturing Co., Michigan, significantly strengthening its market position for control plates for automatic transmissions in North America and worldwide.

The company entered into a strategic partnership with engineering specialist hofer AG in October 2016, also taking a 53 percent interest in the subsidiary hofer powertrain products GmbH. Acquiring this stake enabled ElringKlinger to benefit from the powertrain system developer's innovative strength for developing and manufacturing alternative drive technologies for hybrid or all-electric vehicles.

In March 2021, the company announced a major contract for the supply of battery components for a global battery manufacturer's German plant, scheduled to commence in 2022 and lasting nine years.

Due to the COVID-19 pandemic, ElringKlinger suffered a decline of 11.2% in revenues for 2020 compared to 2019.

Management board 
The board consists of three members:
 Dr. Stefan Wolf (CEO, chairman)
 Theo Becker (CTO, member of the board)
 Thomas Jessulat (CFO, member of the board)
 Reiner Drews (COO, member of the board)

Business divisions 
ElringKlinger is engaging in the following eleven business divisions:
 Cylinder-head gaskets
 Speciality gaskets
 Shielding Technology
 Speciality gaskets
 Lightweighting / Elastomer Technology
 E-Mobility
 Exhaust Gas Purification
 Aftermarket
 Engineered Plastics
 Services
 Industrial Parks

Structure of the ElringKlinger Group

National (Germany) 
 100% Gedächtnisstiftung Karl Müller Belegschaftshilfe GmbH
 92,86 % Elring Klinger Motortechnik GmbH
 96% ElringKlinger Logistic Service GmbH
 80% new enerday GmbH
 77,5 % ElringKlinger Kunststofftechnik GmbH
 100% Polytetra GmbH  (subsidiary of ElringKlinger Kunststofftechnik)
 100% KOCHWERK Catering GmbH
 27% hofer AG
 53% hofer powertrain products GmbH / DE (subsidiary of hofer AG)

International 
 100% ElringKlinger Abschirmtechnik (Schweiz) AG / CH
 93,67 % Hug Engineering AG / CH
 100% Hug Engineering GmbH / DE (subsidiary of Hug Engineering AG / CH)
 100% Hug Engineering Inc. / US (subsidiary of Hug Engineering AG / CH)
 100% Hug Engineering S.p.A. / IT (subsidiary of Hug Engineering AG / CH)
 100% Elring Klinger (Great Britain) Ltd. / UK
 100% Elring Parts Ltd. / UK
 100% ElringKlinger Italia Srl / IT
 100% ElringKlinger Meillor SAS / FR
 100% HURO Supermold S. R. L. / RO
 100% Technik-Park Heliport Kft. / HU
 100% ElringKlinger Hungary Kft. / HU
 100% Elring Klinger, S.A.U. / ES
 100% ElringKlinger TR Otomotiv Şanayi ve Ticaret A.Ş. / TR
 100% ElringKlinger Canada, Inc. / CA
 100% ElringKlinger North America, Inc. / US
 100% ElringKlinger Automotive Manufacturing, Inc. / US
 100% ElringKlinger Silicon Valley, Inc. / US
 100% ElringKlinger USA, Inc. / US
 100% Elring Klinger México, S.A. de C.V. / MX
 100% EKASER, S.A. de C.V. / MX
 100% Elring Klinger do Brasil Ltda. / BR
 100% Elring Klinger South Africa (Pty) Ltd. / ZA
 100% ElringKlinger Automotive Components (India) Pvt. Ltd. / IN
 100% ElringKlinger China, Ltd. / CN
 88% Changchun ElringKlinger Ltd. / CN
 100% ElringKlinger Chongqing Ltd. / CN
 100% ElringKlinger Engineered Plastics (Qingdao) Commercial Co. / CN (subsidiary of ElringKlinger Kunststofftechnik)
 100% ElringKlinger Engineered Plastics North America, Inc. / US (subsidiary of  ElringKlinger Kunststofftechnik)
 100% ElringKlinger Korea / KR
 50% ElringKlinger Marusan Corporation / JP
 100% Taiyo Jushi Kakoh Co., Ltd. / JP (subsidiary of  ElringKlinger Marusan Corporation / JP)
 46,9 % Marusan Kogyo Co., Ltd. / JP
 100% PT. ElringKlinger Indonesia / ID (subsidiary of ElringKlinger Marusan Corporation / JP)
 100% ElringKlinger (Thailand) Co., Ltd. / TH (subsidiary of ElringKlinger Marusan Corporation / JP)
 53% hofer powertrain products UK Ltd. / UK (subsidiary of hofer AG)

References

External links

Engineering companies of Germany